Jay Jay is a 2003 Tamil romance film.

Jay Jay or Jay-Jay may also refer to:
 Jay Jay the Jet Plane, an American live-action/CGI-animated children's television series
 Jay Jays, an Australian apparel chain store

People
 Jay Jay Burridge (born 1971), artist and television presenter
 Jay-Jay Feeney (born 1974), New Zealand radio host
 Jay Jay French (born 1952), founding member of the heavy metal band Twisted Sister
 Jay Jay Johnson (1924–2001), American jazz trombonist, composer and arranger
 Jay-Jay Johanson (born 1969), Swedish singer-songwriter
 Jay Jay Pistolet (born 1987), early stage name of English singer Justin Young
 Jay-Jay Solari, cast member of the original Mickey Mouse Club

See also
 Jai (disambiguation)
 Jay (disambiguation)